The 2006 Coupe de France Final was a football match held at Stade de France, Saint-Denis, Seine-Saint-Denis on 29 April 2006, that saw Paris Saint-Germain defeat Olympique de Marseille 2–1 thanks to goals by Bonaventure Kalou and Vikash Dhorasoo.

Match details

See also
2005–06 Coupe de France
Le Classique

External links
Match report
Coupe de France results at Rec.Sport.Soccer Statistics Foundation
Report on French federation site

2006
Coupe De France Final 2006
Coupe De France Final 2006
France Final
Coupe de France Final
Sport in Saint-Denis, Seine-Saint-Denis
Coupe de France Final